Þaralátursfjörður is a short and small fjord in the Westfjords of Iceland, on the Hornstrandir peninsula. The only farm in the valley is now desolated.

References

Populated places in Westfjords